The men's 100 metres hurdles at the 2011 Asian Athletics Championships was held at the Kobe Universiade Memorial Stadium on the 10 of July.

Medalists

Records

Results

Round 1
First 3 in each heat (Q) and 2 best performers (q) advanced to the Final.

Final

References

110 metres hurdles
Sprint hurdles at the Asian Athletics Championships